Amoore is a surname. Notable people with the surname include:

Edward Amoore (1877–1955), British sport shooter
Frederick Amoore (1913–1996), Anglican bishop
Geoff Amoore (born 1964), Australian rules footballer
John E. Amoore (1930–1998), British biochemist
Judy Amoore (born 1940), Australian sprinter and middle-distance runner
Lesa Amoore, American model and photographer
Renee Amoore (1953–2020), American politician

See also
Amore (disambiguation)
Armour (disambiguation)